Zaheer Maqsood (born 5 May 1985) is a Pakistani-born cricketer who played for the United Arab Emirates national cricket team. He made his One Day International debut for the United Arab Emirates against Hong Kong in the 2015–17 ICC World Cricket League Championship on 16 November 2015. He made his Twenty20 International debut for the UAE against Oman on 22 November 2015.

References

External links
 

1985 births
Living people
Emirati cricketers
United Arab Emirates One Day International cricketers
United Arab Emirates Twenty20 International cricketers
Cricketers from Lahore
Pakistani emigrants to the United Arab Emirates
Pakistani expatriate sportspeople in the United Arab Emirates